Francesco Amico was a prominent Catholic theologian, born in Cosenza, in Calabria, 2 April 1578.

He entered the Society of Jesus in 1596. For twenty-four years he was professor of theology at Naples, Aquila, and Gratz, and, for five years, chancellor in the academy of Gratz. He was scholastic in his method, adapting his treatises to a four-year course of teaching. He wrote De Deo Uno et Trino; De Natura Angelorum; De Ultimo Fine; De Fide, Spe, et Charitate; De Justitia et Jure, which was prohibited, 18 June 1651 donec corrigatur, on account of three propositions in it, which Pope Alexander VII and Innocent XI objected to. The corrected edition of 1649 was permitted. He wrote also on the Incarnation, and the sacraments.

References

Further reading

External links 
 

17th-century Italian Jesuits
17th-century Italian Roman Catholic theologians
1578 births
17th-century deaths
People from Cosenza